João de Faria (born 31 August 1912, date of death unknown) was a Brazilian sports shooter. He competed in the 50 m rifle event at the 1948 Summer Olympics.

References

1912 births
Year of death missing
Brazilian male sport shooters
Olympic shooters of Brazil
Shooters at the 1948 Summer Olympics
Place of birth missing